Tonći Mujan (born 19 July 1995) is a Croatian professional footballer who plays as a winger.

Club career
An offense-oriented winger or a forward, operating mostly on the left side of the attack, Mujan passed through the ranks of Hajduk Split's youth academy. A youth international, he made his first-team debut aged 17, on 4 May 2013, in an away loss against RNK Split, coming in for Ivan Vuković in the 66th minute of the game. On 31 January 2014, he joined Deportivo de La Coruña B on loan.

On 6 February 2017, he joined Slovenian side Krško.

Honours
Hanoi
V.League 1: 2022
Vietnamese Cup: 2022

References

External links

1995 births
Living people
Sportspeople from Šibenik
Association football wingers
Croatian footballers
Croatia youth international footballers
HNK Hajduk Split II players
HNK Hajduk Split players
Deportivo Fabril players
NK Zadar players
NK Krško players
NK Domžale players
Ümraniyespor footballers
NK Aluminij players
NK Široki Brijeg players
Hanoi FC players
Croatian Football League players
Tercera División players
Second Football League (Croatia) players
Slovenian PrvaLiga players
TFF First League players
Premier League of Bosnia and Herzegovina players
V.League 1 players
Croatian expatriate footballers
Expatriate footballers in Spain
Croatian expatriate sportspeople in Spain
Expatriate footballers in Slovenia
Croatian expatriate sportspeople in Slovenia
Expatriate footballers in Turkey
Croatian expatriate sportspeople in Turkey
Expatriate footballers in Bosnia and Herzegovina
Croatian expatriate sportspeople in Bosnia and Herzegovina
Expatriate footballers in Vietnam
Croatian expatriate sportspeople in Vietnam